Ronny Hornschuh (born 2 February 1975) is a German former ski jumper. Currently he is the head coach of the Switzerland ski jumping team.

In the World Cup he finished four times among the top 10, with a second place from Harrachov in December 1998 as his best result. He finished second overall in the Continental Cup in the 1993/94 season.

External links

1975 births
Living people
German male ski jumpers